Nammaw may refer to several places in Burma:

 Nammaw, Homalin
Nammaw, Kalewa